The J. Willard and Alice S. Marriott School of Business (MSB) is a business school at Brigham Young University (BYU), a private university owned by the Church of Jesus Christ of Latter-day Saints (LDS Church), and located in Provo, Utah, United States. The following people have served as deans of the MSB:

Weldon J. Taylor (1957-1974): first dean
Bryce B. Orton, Acting Dean (1974-1975)
Merrill J. Bateman (1975-1979): Economist, future LDS Church general authority and president of BYU
William G. Dyer (1979-1984)
Paul H. Thompson (1984-1989)
K. Fred Skousen (1989-1998)
Ned C. Hill (1998-2008): Finance professor
Gary C. Cornia (2008-2013): Past president of the National Tax Association
Lee Tom Perry (2013–2018): Professor of Organizational Leadership
Brigitte C. Madrian (2018-present): Behavioral economist, first female dean

References

Sources

Brigham Young University
Brigham Young University faculty